Bloody Beach is a 2000 South Korean slasher film starring Kim Hyun-jung and Jae Hee.

Synopsis
A group of chat room buddies decide to meet together in person on the beach for some fun in the sun. However, their vacation transforms into a nightmare as each person except Nam-kyeong (Kim Hyun-jung) is gruesomely murdered by the mysterious 'Sandmanzz'.

Cast
  - Nam-kyeong
 Lee hyun kyun - Won-il (Sandmanzz)
 Lee Se-eun - Yeong-woo
 Lee Seung-chae - Yu-na
 Lee Jung-jin - Sang-tae
Jin tae sung-Jung min
 Kim Min-sun - Do-yeon
 Lee Eun-ju-Mermaid

References

External links
 

2000 films
Films set on beaches
South Korean horror films
South Korean slasher films
South Korean serial killer films
2000s Korean-language films
2000 horror films
2000s South Korean films